Patrick Goldstein is an American former film critic and columnist for the Los Angeles Times who wrote about movies in a column titled The Big Picture. Colleague Tom O'Neil described him as the newspaper's "chief Oscarologist" as his column focused largely on the doings of the Academy Awards. Goldstein and O'Neil had a long rivalry concerning the outcome of annual Academy Awards.

Goldstein left the paper in 2012 after a change in management.

Rob Schneider conflict
In his January 2005 Oscar preview, Goldstein commented that that year's Best Picture nominees were "ignored, unloved and turned down flat by most of the same studios that ... bankroll hundreds of sequels, including a follow-up to Deuce Bigalow: Male Gigolo, a film that was sadly overlooked at Oscar time because apparently nobody had the foresight to invent a category for Best Running Penis Joke Delivered by a Third-Rate Comic."

Schneider retaliated by placing an ad in the Los Angeles Times two weeks later, commenting that Goldstein was unqualified to opine this because he had never won the Pulitzer Prize, or any other journalistic award, because, he remarked, "they haven't invented a category for Best Third-Rate, Unfunny Pompous Reporter Who's Never Been Acknowledged by His Peers." Roger Ebert of the Chicago Sun-Times intervened by saying that, "Schneider can dish it out, but he can't take it." Then responded," He's not so good at dishing it out either." Ebert went on to point out on his site that Goldstein won a National Headliner Award, a Los Angeles Press Club Award, a RockCritics.com award, and the Publicists' Guild award for lifetime achievement.

Ebert continued in his review: "Schneider was nominated for a 2000 Razzie Award for Worst Supporting Actor, but lost to Jar-Jar Binks. But Schneider is correct, and Patrick Goldstein has not yet won a Pulitzer Prize. Therefore, Goldstein is not qualified to complain that Columbia financed Deuce Bigalow: European Gigolo while passing on the opportunity to participate in Million Dollar Baby, Ray, The Aviator, Sideways, and Finding Neverland. As chance would have it, I have won the Pulitzer Prize, and so I am qualified. Speaking in my official capacity as a Pulitzer Prize winner, Mr. Schneider, your movie sucks."

Schneider later publicly admitted that he later found out that Goldstein won the Lifetime Achievement Award from the Publicist Guild and apologized. He then remarked, "My only regret is that he (Goldstein) got a little famous out of it."

References

20th-century American non-fiction writers
21st-century American non-fiction writers
American film critics
American columnists
Living people
Los Angeles Times people
Year of birth missing (living people)
20th-century American male writers
American male non-fiction writers
21st-century American male writers